Arhopala abseus, the aberrant oakblue or aberrant bushblue, is a species of lycaenid or blue butterfly found in Asia.

Description

References

Arhopala
Butterflies of Asia
Butterflies of Singapore
Butterflies described in 1862
Taxa named by William Chapman Hewitson